There Goes the Neighborhood is a political podcast about gentrification.

Background 
Season one of the podcast focuses on the city of Brooklyn and is a collaboration between WNYC Studios and The Nation. Season two of the podcast focuses on Los Angeles and is a collaboration between WNYC Studios and KCRW. Season three focuses on the city of Miami and is a collaboration between WNYC Studios and WLRN. The podcast discusses the politics and economics of gentrification as well as systemic racism and white flight. Part way through the production of the podcast co-host Rebecca Carroll learned from her landlords that her home was being torn down and rebuilt.

Reception 
The podcast was on The Atlantics list of "The 50 Best Podcasts of 2016".

References

External links 

2016 podcast debuts
2019 podcast endings
History podcasts
Political podcasts
Gentrification in the United States
American podcasts